Les Grésillons is a station in Paris' express suburban rail system, the RER. In the future, Paris Metro Line 15 will stop here. It is situated in Gennevilliers, in the département of Hauts-de-Seine, and close to the industrial zone of the Caboeufs.

See also 
 List of stations of the Paris RER

References

External links 

 

Railway stations in France opened in 1908
Réseau Express Régional stations in Hauts-de-Seine